"Put Your Hand Inside the Puppet Head" is a song by alternative rock band They Might Be Giants, from their eponymous debut album They Might Be Giants. It has also been released on several compilation albums, including Then: The Earlier Years and A User's Guide to They Might Be Giants.

Background
The song's music and chorus were written by John Linnell; John Flansburgh wrote the verses. Linnell used a Casio MT-100 to play the music. Although "Put Your Hand Inside the Puppet Head" was included on They Might Be Giants' first album on Bar/None Records, the song was recorded before the band became associated with the label.

Music video
"Put Your Hand Inside the Puppet Head" was the first song for which They Might Be Giants created a music video. It featured a number of homemade props, such as large red papier-mâché hands and large cardboard cutouts of William Allen White's face. According to commentary in the group's video compilation Direct from Brooklyn, the film Married to the Mob was being filmed in the same location. Adam Bernstein has stated that some shots from the music video were filmed on the tails of the film used to shoot Married to the Mob, and that in total, only about five minutes of film were shot. The video aired on AL-TV, an MTV special hosted by "Weird Al" Yankovic,  prior to the release of the band's debut album. Previously, it had also aired on a local music video station.

Reception
An Allmusic review identified "Put Your Hand Inside the Puppet Head" one of the best songs on They Might Be Giants and described it as "Costello-esque". Jim Faber, reviewing They Might Be Giants for Rolling Stone, called the song "irresistibly catchy" and cited it as an example of Flansburgh's "character" vocals.

References

External links
"Put Your Hand Inside The Puppet Head" at This Might Be A Wiki
"Put Your Hand Inside The Puppet Head" on Allmusic
"Put Your Hand Inside The Puppet Head" on Last.fm

1986 songs
They Might Be Giants songs
Songs written by John Flansburgh
Songs written by John Linnell